Old Town/Chinatown station is a MAX Light Rail station served by the Blue and Red Lines.  It is located in the Old Town Chinatown neighborhood in Portland, Oregon and is currently the 6th stop eastbound on the Eastside MAX. It is also the last stop before crossing the Willamette River. It is next to the Portland Downtown Heliport. The station was previously also served by the Yellow Line, from 2004 to 2009, until that line's relocation to the Portland Transit Mall.

The station has side platforms built into the sidewalk of NW First Avenue.  It is just east of the Portland Classical Chinese Garden and is within walking distance of Union Station, including Amtrak, and the Greyhound bus station.

Bus line connections
This station is served by the following bus lines:   
4 – Fessenden
8 – Jackson Park/NE 15th
16 – Front Ave/St. Helens Rd
35 – Macadam/Greeley
44 – Capitol Hwy/Mocks Crest
77 – Broadway/Halsey

External links

Station information (with southbound/westbound ID number) from TriMet
Station information (with northbound/eastbound ID number) from TriMet

MAX Light Rail stations
MAX Blue Line
MAX Red Line
Railway stations in the United States opened in 1986
Old Town Chinatown
1986 establishments in Oregon
Northwest Portland, Oregon
Railway stations in Portland, Oregon